School District 47 Powell River is a school district in British Columbia. It covers the community of Powell River as well as Texada Island.  Its board is composed of five elected trustees. They are:  Dale Lawson (chairwoman), Doug Skinner, Brendan Behan, Jaclyn Miller and Rob Hill.

Schools

See also
List of school districts in British Columbia

Powell River, British Columbia
47